The 2018 Women's EuroHockey Club Trophy was the 42nd edition of the women's Women's EuroHockey Club Trophy, Europe's secondary club field hockey tournament organized by the EHF. It was held from 18 to 21 May 2018 at Monkstown Hockey Club in Dún Laoghaire–Rathdown, Ireland.

Holcombe won the tournament after defeating Junior 4–2 in penalties after the final finished a 1–1 draw. Grodno finished third, after defeating Krylatskoye 5–4 in the third place playoff.

Teams

 Grodno
 Prague
 Holcombe
 Lille
 Monkstown
 Krylatskoye
 Junior
 Sumchanka

Results

Preliminary round

Pool A

Pool B

Classification round

Seventh and eighth place

Fifth and sixth place

Third and fourth place

Final

Statistics

Final standings

References

2018
2017–18 in European field hockey
2018 in women's field hockey
2018 in Irish women's sport
International women's field hockey competitions hosted by Ireland
Sport in Dún Laoghaire–Rathdown
May 2018 sports events in Europe